The one-eyed, one-armed swordsman  is a fictional character in Japanese literature, cinema and TV. The loyal Sōma clan samurai Tange Samanosuke is attacked and mutilated as the result of a betrayal, losing his right eye and right arm. He then begins to lead the life of a nihilistic ronin, using the pseudonym Sazen.

Development
The story concerned the exploits of Ōoka Echizen, and Sazen was a minor character. The most popular of these movies was that directed by Daisuke Itō at Nikkatsu, starring . As a result of the success of these films, Hayashi wrote a new serial, Tange Sazen, with Tange as the hero. This initially ran in the Mainichi Shimbun from June to October 1933, but internal strife at the newspaper led to the interruption of publication and the serial eventually resumed in the Yomiuri Shimbun from January 1934. In this story, Tange developed from the nihilistic character he had been in the first novel to a doughty fighter against injustice. The film The Million Ryo Pot featured Ōkōchi playing a comic Tange. Ōkōchi is the actor most identified with Tange in the cinema, but many others have played the role, including Tsumasaburō Bandō, Ryūtarō Ōtomo, Ryūnosuke Tsukigata, Kinnosuke Nakamura, and Tetsurō Tanba. Komako Hara also played a female Sazen in a couple of films in 1937.

In literature 

 The Mysterious Sword aka lit. The Magic Sword (丹下左膳　妖刀濡れ燕) (1960)
 Mentioned in the manga Deadman Wonderland chapter 51.

Television
 Tange Sazen: (1958–59) played by Tetsuro Tamba
 Tange Sazen: (1965–66) played by Takeya Nakamura
 Tange Sazen: (1970) played by Ken Ogata

In films 
 Tange Sazen: Hyakuman ryō no tsubo (2004) played by Toyokawa Etsushi
 Onna Sazen: Nuretsubame Katate Giri (Lady Sazen and the Drenched Swallow Sword) (1969) with Michiyo Okusu
 Onna Sazen (One-Eyed, One-Armed Swordswoman) (1968) with Michiyo Okusu as "O-kin", the female "Sazen"
 Tange Sazen: Hien iaigiri (The Secret of the Urn) (1966) played by Nakamura Kinnosuke 
 Tange Sazen Nuretsubame Ittōryū (Tange Sazen and the Princess) (1961) played by Ōtomo Ryūtarō
 Tange Sazen Yōtō Nuretsubame (The Mysterious Sword) (1960) played by Ōtomo Ryūtarō
 Tange Sazen doto-hen (The Mystery of the Twin Dragons) (1959) played by Ōtomo Ryūtarō
 Tange Sazen (1958) played by Ōtomo Ryūtarō
 Onna Sazen (女左膳) (Lady Sazen) (1937), played by Hara Komako as "Lady Sazen"
 Tange Sazen Yowa - Hyakumanryō No Tsubo (The Million Ryo Pot) (1935) played by Ôkôchi Denjirô

See also
Baiken

References

External links 
 Sazen Tange search listing at IMDB

Fictional amputees
Fictional blind characters
Jidaigeki
Male characters in literature
Literary characters introduced in 1927
Works originally published in Japanese newspapers
Jidaigeki television series
Fictional male martial artists